Amblyscirtes aenus, the bronze roadside skipper, is a species of grass skipper in the butterfly family Hesperiidae. It is found in Central America and North America.

Subspecies
These three subspecies belong to the species Amblyscirtes aenus:
 Amblyscirtes aenus aenus W. H. Edwards, 1878
 Amblyscirtes aenus erna H. Freeman, 1943
 Amblyscirtes aenus megamacula Scott, 1998

References

Further reading

 

Hesperiinae
Articles created by Qbugbot
Butterflies described in 1878